Angus McGillis (September 8, 1874 – September 11, 1944) was a Canadian farmer and political figure in Ontario. He represented Glengarry in the Legislative Assembly of Ontario from 1926 to 1929 and in the House of Commons of Canada from 1930 to 1935 as a Conservative member.

He was born in Williamstown, Ontario, the son of Hugh McGillis, and was educated there. He was also a livestock dealer. McGillis was an unsuccessful candidate for a seat in the federal parliament in 1925. He was defeated in 1929 by James Alexander Sangster for a seat in the provincial assembly but was elected to the House of Commons the following year. He was defeated by John David MacRae in the 1935 federal election.

External links 

Stormont, Dundas and Glengarry : a history, 1784-1945, JG Harkness (1946)

1874 births
1944 deaths
Conservative Party of Canada (1867–1942) MPs
Members of the House of Commons of Canada from Ontario
People from the United Counties of Stormont, Dundas and Glengarry
Progressive Conservative Party of Ontario MPPs